Stephen Lester Reeves (January 21, 1926 – May 1, 2000) was an American professional bodybuilder, actor, and philanthropist. He was famous in the mid-1950s as a movie star in Italian-made sword-and-sandal films, playing the protagonist as muscular characters such as Hercules, Goliath, and Sandokan. At the peak of his career, he was the highest-paid actor in Europe. Though best known for his portrayal of Hercules, he played the character only twice: in Hercules (1958), and in its 1959 sequel Hercules Unchained. By 1960, Reeves was ranked as the number-one box-office draw in 25 countries around the world.

Early life
Born in Glasgow, Montana, in 1926, Reeves moved to California at age 10 with his mother Goldie Reeves after his father Lester Dell Reeves died in a farming accident. Reeves developed an interest in bodybuilding at Castlemont High School and trained at Ed Yarick's gym in Oakland, California. After graduating from high school, he enlisted in the United States Army during World War II, and served in the Philippines. After his military service Reeves attended California Chiropractic College in San Francisco.

He reigned as Mr. America of 1947, Mr. World of 1948, and Mr. Universe of 1950 in the pre Mr. Olympia era. The first Mr. Olympia was held fifteen years later in 1965. He was contacted by an agent who suggested he go into acting.

Career

Cecil B. de Mille
Reeves moved to New York where he studied acting under Stella Adler, but after arguments he was refunded his tuition. He studied instead at the Theodora Irvin School of the Theatre. He began performing a vaudeville act with a comedian named Dick Burney. One of Cecil B. De Mille's talent scouts saw him and had him tested for Samson and Delilah (1949). Reeves received a seven-year contract with Paramount. Reeves stated that De Mille wanted to cast him in the lead role, but told Reeves he had to lose 15 pounds in order to look convincing on-camera. Reeves says he tried to lose the weight and worked on his acting in preparation for the role over three months. Then, De Mille told him he was going to give the role to Victor Mature.

Early acting appearances
In 1949, Reeves filmed a Tarzan-type television pilot called Kimbar of the Jungle, and in 1950 became Mr. Universe. He appeared on television in Stars Over Hollywood  in the episode "Prison Doctor" with Raymond Burr. He appeared on the TV series Topper ("Reducing"). 

In 1954, Reeves had a small supporting role as a cop in the Ed Wood film Jail Bait.  It was his first film and earned him his Screen Actors Guild card. "I had a suit on at all times," he later recalled. "I even had a tie. Only took my shirt off once. Those were the days, huh?" 

The same year Reeves was in the MGM musical Athena, playing the boyfriend of Jane Powell's character. These two films are the only ones Reeves made in the United States where his actual voice was used; Reeves acted in Italian-made films for the remainder of his career, where all dialogue and sound effects were added in post-production.

Reeves guest-starred on The George Burns and Gracie Allen Show as the owner of a gym. On December 17, 1954, Reeves guest-starred in the ABC sitcom Where's Raymond?, starring Ray Bolger as Raymond Wallace, a song-and-dance man. Reeves played a well-built office employee whom Wallace sees in the company of Wallace's girlfriend, Susan.

In 1955, Reeves appeared in two Broadway shows, Kismet and The Vamp. Pictures of Reeves' costume test for the lead in Li'l Abner (1959) can be found on the Internet. He  worked for American Health Studios in public relations, opening up fitness studios. That same year he married his first wife, teenaged starlet Sandra Smith.

Hercules

In Italy, director Pietro Francisci wanted to make a film about Hercules but could not find anyone suitable to play the role. His daughter recommended Reeves on the basis of his appearance in Athena and Francisci offered him the role and a plane ticket to Italy. Reeves at first did not think he was serious but eventually agreed and flew to Italy to make the film. His fee was $10,000. Hercules was a relatively low-budget epic based loosely on the tales of Jason and the Argonauts, though inserting Hercules into the lead role.

The film proved popular in Europe. What made it an international sensation was when US distribution rights were bought by Joseph E. Levine, who spent over $1 million promoting it, turning the film into a major box-office success, grossing $5 million in the United States in 1959. However this did not happen until Reeves had already made four more films in Europe.

The first was a sequel to Hercules, Hercules Unchained (1959), again directed by Francisci. Reeves was paid the same fee, although his wage would double from then on. This film was another huge success, being the third most popular film in Britain in 1960. Nonetheless Reeves would not play Hercules again, despite his identification with the role. Reeves' third film as star was The White Warrior (1959), based on Hadji Murat, the novel by Leo Tolstoy. He played Hadji Murad, a 19th-century Chechen chieftain who led his warriors in a fight against the invading Russians.

Reeves also played Emilio in Terror of the Barbarians, about the Lombard invasion of Italy. American International Pictures bought US rights and retitled it Goliath and the Barbarians (1959), with Reeves's character renamed "Goliath". The film earned $1.6 million in North America during its initial release, when it was double billed with Sign of the Gladiator.

Injury
Reeves was Glaucus Leto in The Last Days of Pompeii (1959), based on the novel by Sir Edward Bulwer-Lytton. It co-starred Christine Kaufmann and Fernando Rey and was mostly directed by Sergio Leone. During the filming, Reeves dislocated his shoulder when his chariot slammed into a tree; he re-injured it while swimming in a subsequent underwater escape scene. The injury would be aggravated by his stunt work in each successive film, ultimately leading to his retirement from filmmaking.

American Directors
Reeves followed this with The Giant of Marathon (1959) where he was cast as Pheidippides, the famous wartime messenger of the Battle of Marathon. By now Reeves' success was such that his films would use Hollywood directors: Marathon was directed by Mario Bava and Jacques Tourneur. According to MGM records the film earned $1,335,000 in the US and Canada and $1.4 million elsewhere resulting in a profit of $429,000.

Reeves had a change of pace in Morgan, the Pirate (1960) where he played pirate and self-proclaimed governor of Jamaica, Captain Henry Morgan. Andre De Toth and Primo Zeglio directed.
He then did an "Eastern", The Thief of Baghdad (1961), playing Karim, directed by Arthur Lubin. In The Wooden Horse of Troy (1961) Reeves played Aeneas of Troy, opposite John Drew Barrymore. He co-starred with fellow body builder Gordon Scott in Duel of the Titans (1961), playing Romulus and Remus respectively. Sergio Corbucci directed. Reeves played Randus, the son of Spartacus in The Slave (1962) then reprised his role as Aeneas in War of the Trojans (1962) aka The Avenger.

Later roles

Reeves played Sandokan in two films, both directed by Umberto Lenzi: Sandokan the Great (1963) and Pirates of Malaysia (1964).  Reeves said that by this stage his fee was $250,000 a film. In 1968, Reeves appeared in his final film, a spaghetti Western he co-wrote, titled I Live For Your Death! (later released as A Long Ride From Hell). "I ended up with an ulcer from that," he said later. "That was my last."

Reeves reportedly turned down the James Bond role in Dr. No (1962) because of the low salary the producers offered. Reeves also declined the role that finally went to Clint Eastwood in A Fistful of Dollars (1964) because he did not believe that Italians could make a western out of a Japanese samurai film.

George Pal contacted Reeves for the role of Doc Savage in Doc Savage: The Man of Bronze,  the first of what was meant to be a film series, but when filming was about to begin a Hollywood writers strike put the film on hold with Reeves and the original director replaced. Reeves's last screen appearance was in 2000 when he appeared as himself in the made-for-television A&E Biography: Arnold Schwarzenegger  Flex Appeal.

Post-acting
Reeves decided to retire for several reasons: stress, his injury, and the decline in the market for his sort of movies. He later purchased a ranch in Valley Center, California. It would be his home for the rest of his life. Reeves bred horses and promoted drug-free bodybuilding. The last two decades of his life were spent in Valley Center, where he  lived with his second wife, Aline, until her death in 1989.

Other interests
Reeves' authorized biography, Steve Reeves – One of a Kind, was published in 1983 by Milton T. Moore. Moore worked with Reeves and Steve's wife at the time, Aline, for over 12 years before receiving publishing approval. Reeves was reportedly to promote the book at public appearances. 

In 1991, writer Chris LeClaire began writing and researching Steve Reeves' life and career for a biography. In 1999, LeClaire published Worlds To Conquer, which LeClaire described as an authorized biography. Deborah Reeves Stewart, Reeves' companion during the book's development phases, who assisted him in reviewing drafts, stated that Reeves never approved or authorized Worlds to Conquer for final publication or release, due to inaccuracies, careless writing, and failure to add Reeves' final comments.

In 1994, Reeves, with long-time friend and business partner George Helmer, started the Steve Reeves International Society. In 1996, it incorporated to become Steve Reeves International, Inc. In 2003, Helmer co-authored Steve Reeves – His Legacy in Films, and in 2010, Steve Reeves' Hercules Cookbook. In 2014, he published a Reeves biography, A Moment in Time – The Steve Reeves Story.  Helmer is also the executor of the Reeves' estate, which owns the rights to Reeves' name and image.

Reeves wrote the book Powerwalking, and two self-published books, Building the Classic Physique - The Natural Way, and Dynamic Muscle Building. George Helmer published a revised and updated edition of the Powerwalking book in 2013.

Freelance writer Rod Labbe interviewed Reeves in 1997, and the article appeared in Films of the Golden Age magazine, summer 2011.

Death
Reeves had exploratory surgery late Friday afternoon on April 28, 2000, and died shortly before noon on Monday, May 1, 2000, from a blood clot. He died at Palomar Hospital in Escondido, California, where his second wife had also died.

Filmography

See also
List of male professional bodybuilders

References

Further reading
LeClaire, Christopher D. "STEVE REEVES - WORLDS TO CONQUER - An Authorized Biography" , December 1999, 2017. 
Chapman, David. "On The Cover: Steve Reeves", Hardgainer, November 1992.
Moore, Milton Jr. "STEVE REEVES - One of a Kind (An Authorized and Approved Reeves Biography)", 1983. 
Helmer, George. "A Moment in Time - The Steve Reeves Story", 2014 
Dowling, Dave and Helmer, George. "STEVE REEVES - His Legacy in Films", 2003

External links
 
 Worlds To Conquer The Authorized Biography Of Steve Reeves
 Steve Reeves International Society

 How Steve Reeves Trained by John Grimek, Muscular Development November, 1964 
 The Many Faces of Hercules at Brian's Drive-In Theater
 Reeves gallery and Reeves movie related articles

1926 births
2000 deaths
20th-century American male actors
American bodybuilders
American expatriates in Italy
American male film actors
American male television actors
United States Army personnel of World War II
Deaths from cancer in California
Deaths from lymphoma
Expatriate male actors in Italy
Male actors from California
Male actors from Montana
People associated with physical culture
People from Glasgow, Montana
Professional bodybuilders